Cyclops Read is the fifth studio album by American musician Tim Presley, who goes under the name White Fence. It was April 2013 under Castle Face Records.

Track list

References

2013 albums
Tim Presley albums